222 Main a high-rise office building in Salt Lake City, Utah,  United States, that was Utah’s first LEED Gold-certified high-rise.

Description

The structure stands 22 stories high and is located at 222 South Main Street in the Central City neighborhood. The shape of the building is designed to optimize views between currently standing buildings, includes a parking garage hidden behind the main structure and has  of office space with floor to ceiling windows. There are a total of 6,257 pieces of structural steel and bracing in the structure and wiring that stretches . Atop the building is a  glass veil that is illuminated with different colors at various times of the year.

The building cost $125 million (equivalent to $ million in ) and took nearly two years to complete.

LEED Certification
Originally, the building was expected to earn LEED Silver certification, but along the way improvements were made and the building ultimately earned LEED Gold certification.

Architect
The building was designed by architectural firm Skidmore, Owings & Merrill LLP (SOM). SOM has also designed buildings such as the Willis Tower in Chicago, the Burj Khalifa in the United Arab Emirates (the world's current tallest building), and the Air Force Academy Chapel in Colorado Springs, Colorado, Colorado. SOM also designed the One World Trade Center, which was built near where the destroyed World Trade Center once stood.

History
Construction on the building was completed in December 2009. The building was facing serious occupancy issues, with the pre-lease rate remaining at around 25% but rates subsequently increased, especially with the largely publicized lease announcement of Goldman Sachs. The building eventually became fully occupied.

In February 2014, the property's original owners (and current building manager), Hamilton Partners, sold the building to KBS Real Estate Investment Trust III (KBS) for $170.5 million (equivalent to $ million in ) in "a record-setting deal for commercial real estate in Utah's capital city, on a cost per-square footage basis." At the time of purchase, KBS already owned the Parkside Tower and Gateway Tech Center in Salt Lake City.

See also

 Buildings and sites of Salt Lake City, Utah
 List of tallest buildings in Salt Lake City
 Leadership in Energy and Environmental Design

References

External links

 
 Downtown Rising's 222 Main webpage
 Skidmore, Owings & Merrill
 KBS's 222 Main webpage
 Hamilton Partners' 222 Main webpage
 U.S. Green Building Council
 U.S. Green Building Council – Utah Chapter

Leadership in Energy and Environmental Design gold certified buildings
Skidmore, Owings & Merrill buildings
Skyscraper office buildings in Salt Lake City